Kalara may refer to:

 Kalara, a town in West Bengal, India
 Kalara, Bhopal, a village in Madhya Pradesh, India
 Kalara International Properties, a company of Thailand
 PS Kalara, a paddle steam vessel which sunk off Tweed Heads, Australia